The 1991 Pan American Games were held in Havana, Cuba from August 2 to August 18, 1991. There were 4,519 athletes from 39 countries of the PASO community, with events in 33 different sports. The main stadium was the Estadio Panamericano, a multi-use stadium in Havana that holds 50,000 people.

Host city election

Havana was the only non-withdrawn bid to host the 1991 Pan American Games. At the Pan American Games (ODEPA) Assembly, from November 12 to 14, 1986, in Bridgetown, Barbados, Mar del Plata withdrew its bid, leaving Havana as the winner to host the Games. London, Ontario, Canada also submitted a bid, but withdrew from the bid process due to the federal government prohibiting all funding from any international multi-sport events (aside from the 1988 Calgary Winter Olympics).

Participating nations

Sports
 Bowling made its debut at the Pan American Games

 
 
 
 
 
 
 
 
 
 
 
 
 
 
 
  Racquetball
  Roller skating

Medal table 

To sort this table by nation, total medal count, or any other column, click on the  icon next to the column title.
R

Mascot

The 1991 Games' mascot named Tocopan, was a combination of the country's national bird "Tocororo" and the first three letters of Panamerican.

References

  guajiroarrepentio
  quadrodemedalhas
  esportes.terra.com

External links
 Havana 1991 - XI Pan American Games - Official Report at PanamSports.org

 
Pan American Games
Pan American Games
Pan American Games
Multi-sport events in Cuba
Sports competitions in Havana
Pan American Games
20th century in Havana
August 1991 sports events in North America